Tadhg P. Begley is an Irish chemist and Distinguished Professor, Robert A. Welch Foundation Chair and Derek Barton Chair of Chemistry at Texas A&M University, and also a published author of books. His honors include Elected Fellow of the American Association for the Advancement of Science, National Institutes of Health Merit Award, National University of Chemistry Honorary D.Sc.

References

Year of birth missing (living people)
Living people
21st-century American chemists
Texas A&M University faculty
Alumni of the University of Galway
California Institute of Technology alumni
People educated at North Monastery